Fort Klamath is an unincorporated community between Crater Lake National Park and Upper Klamath Lake in Klamath County, Oregon, United States.

The community is located about a mile northwest of Fort Klamath, the Oregon Trail military outpost. Fort Klamath post office was established January 6, 1879.

Climate
This region experiences warm (but not hot) and dry summers, with no average monthly temperatures above 71.6 °F.  According to the Köppen Climate Classification system, Fort Klamath has a warm-summer Mediterranean climate, abbreviated "Csb" on climate maps.

References

External links
Photos of Fort Klamath on Flickr, by Jasperdo

Unincorporated communities in Klamath County, Oregon
1879 establishments in Oregon
Populated places established in 1879
Unincorporated communities in Oregon